The second USS Trippe (DD-33) was a  in the United States Navy during World War I and later in the United States Coast Guard, designated (CG-20). She was named for Lieutenant John Trippe.

Trippe was laid down on 12 April 1910 at Bath, Maine, by the Bath Iron Works; launched on 20 December 1910; sponsored by Mrs. John S. Hyde; and commissioned at the Boston Navy Yard on 23 March 1911, Lieutenant Frank D. Berrien in command.

Pre-World War I
Upon commissioning, Trippe joined the torpedo boat destroyers and submarines assigned to the east coast as a unit of the Atlantic Torpedo Fleet. For the next three years, she conducted routine operations along the east coast. In 1911, she completed trials and participated in exercises off Newport, Boston, and the Virginia Capes. She made her first cruise to southern waters in 1912. She cleared Newport on 3 January and dropped anchor in Guantanamo Bay 11 days later. Following three months of training at Guantanamo Bay and in the Gulf of Mexico, the torpedo boat destroyer returned north in April and entered Boston harbor on the 21st. After repairs, Trippe resumed training operations off the northeastern coast. On 2 January 1913, the warship headed south once more for three months of tactical exercises and gunnery drills out of Guantanamo Bay and in the Gulf of Guacanayabo. She returned to Boston on 14 April and spent the remainder of 1913 in operations off the coast between Boston and Norfolk, Virginia.

Trippe began 1914 as she had the previous two years — by heading south and conducting battle practice in the Caribbean through the end of March. However, in April, the Tampico incident brought her to the shores of Mexico, when American sailors and Marines went ashore at Veracruz and seized the customs house on the 21st. Trippe arrived off Tampico on the 22d and patrolled the area for a week to prevent arms from being landed. On 1 May, she steamed south to Vera Cruz where she conducted more patrols and supported the battleships and cruisers operating in the vicinity. Near the end of the month, Trippe cleared Mexican waters; and, on the 31st, entered Boston harbor.

At the completion of an extensive overhaul, the warship conducted trials and drills in the Boston area from mid-August to late September. On 30 September, Trippe arrived at Newport for a week of operation before heading south. She shifted to Hampton Roads in mid-October and participated in exercises there and at Lynnhaven Bay for a month before returning to Boston.

The warship spent December and the first three weeks of 1915 in the Boston area and, on 26 January, arrived in Guantanamo Bay to resume her schedule of winter drills in the Caribbean. Late in March, Trippe pointed her bow northward once more and reached Boston on 6 April. After her normal round of maneuvers off the northeastern coast, the torpedo boat destroyer returned to Boston on 23 October. A little less than two months later — on 13 December 1915 — Trippe became a unit of the newly organized 2nd Reserve Flotilla. On 5 January 1916, she was designated a "Destroyer operating with reduced complement;" and, on the 27th, she was placed in ordinary at the Boston Navy Yard.

World War I
The threat of war, however, made her retirement a brief one. Trippe was placed in full commission once again at Boston on 25 July 1916. During the following eight months, Trippe trained along the coast in preparation for the increasingly probable entry of the United States into World War I. The United States declared war on the German Empire on 6 April 1917. Trippe continued to operate off the coast until early May, when she entered Boston and commenced preparations for duty overseas.

On 21 May, the destroyer cleared Boston for Britain. After a call at St. John's, Newfoundland, she arrived in Queenstown on the southern coast of Ireland, the location of a major wartime American destroyer base. She paused only long enough to refuel and make voyage repairs before clearing the harbor on 5 June for her first patrol. From Queenstown, she escorted Allied convoys on the last leg of their voyage from America to France and England. Her field of operations, situated as it was in the war zone which had been established around the British Isles by Germany on 5 February 1915, was the prime hunting ground of High Seas Fleet U-boats. When not engaged in escorting convoys, Trippe patrolled the waters around Queenstown in an effort to detect and destroy as many enemy submarines as possible.

The warship had only one verified scrape with German U-boats. Trippe dropped depth charges, but without "visible results", and continued on to rendezvous with an eastbound convoy. That night, she dueled with another adversary — the sea. In a raging storm, waves carried her starboard waist gun platform overboard. Trippe, however, successfully shepherded her convoy into Quiberon Bay, France, made repairs quickly, and resumed her grueling routine.

Through the final year of the war, Trippe and her sister ships slowly bested the enemy. Convoys of merchant ships carried troops and supplies to France, where the armies of the Allies grew steadily. By the fall of 1918, they reached a point of overwhelming superiority over those of the Central Powers. On 11 November, the day of the signing of the armistice, Trippe was in port at Queenstown. Just over a month later, she cleared that Irish port, refueled at the Azores and Bermuda, and returned to Boston on 3 January 1919. After six months of operations along the eastern seaboard, the destroyer entered the Philadelphia Navy Yard on 23 July for preinactivation overhaul. On 6 November 1919, Trippe was decommissioned and placed in reserve at Philadelphia, Pennsylvania.

Inter-war period
Trippes inactivity lasted five years. By 1924, Prohibition had spawned a thriving traffic in smuggling alcoholic beverages. The Coast Guard's small fleet, charged with stopping the illegal importation of alcohol, was unequal to the task. Consequently, President Calvin Coolidge proposed to increase that fleet by 20 of the Navy's inactive destroyers, and Congress authorized the necessary funds on 2 April 1924. Coast Guardsmen and Navy yard workers overhauled Trippes hull, stripped her of depth charge gear and torpedo tubes, and removed one of her four guns. On 7 June 1924, Trippe was transferred to the Treasury Department; and, on 24 June, she was placed in commission as Trippe (CG-20), Lieutenant Commander John H. Cornell, USCG, in command. For the next four years, the former Navy destroyer operated along the northeastern coast out of New London, Connecticut, as a cutter of the Coast Guard's "rum patrol."

Trippe was placed in reduced commission at New London on 5 January 1929. That October, she was moved to Stapleton, New York. From January to March 1930, she was overhauled at the New York Navy Yard. After a month of gunnery exercises off St. Petersburg, Florida, she returned to Stapleton on 23 April to resume operations along the coast. On 18 December, Trippe cleared Stapleton for the Philadelphia Navy Yard. The Coast Guard decommissioned Trippe at Philadelphia on 15 April 1931 and returned her to the Navy on 2 May.

She remained in reserve at Philadelphia until 1934 when she was scrapped. Her name was struck from the Naval Vessel Register on 5 July 1934. She was sold to Michael Flynn, Inc. of Brooklyn, New York on 22 August 1934.

References

External links
 

 

Paulding-class destroyers
Monaghan-class destroyers
World War I destroyers of the United States
Ships built in Bath, Maine
1910 ships